Camilo José Cela y Trulock, 1st Marquess of Iria Flavia (11 May 1916 – 17 January 2002) was a Spanish novelist, poet, story writer and essayist associated with the Generation of '36 movement.

He was awarded the 1989 Nobel Prize in Literature "for a rich and intensive prose, which with restrained compassion forms a challenging vision of man's vulnerability".

Childhood and early career
Camilo José Cela was born in the rural parish of Iria Flavia, in Padrón, A Coruña, Spain, on 11 May 1916. He was the oldest child of nine. His father, Camilo Crisanto Cela y Fernández, was Galician. His mother, Camila Emanuela Trulock y Bertorini, was a Galician of English and Italian ancestry. The family was upper-middle-class and Cela described his childhood as being "so happy it was hard to grow up."

He lived with his family in Vigo from 1921 to 1925, when they moved to Madrid. There, Cela studied at a Piarist school. In 1931 he was diagnosed with tuberculosis and admitted to the sanatorium of Guadarrama, where he took advantage of his free time to work on his novel Pabellón de reposo. While recovering from the illness Cela began intensively reading works by José Ortega y Gasset and Antonio de Solís y Ribadeneyra.

The Spanish Civil War broke out in 1936 when Cela was 20 years old and just recovering from his illness. His political leanings were conservative and he escaped to the rebel zone. He enlisted himself as a soldier but was wounded and hospitalized in Logroño.

Career
The civil war ended in 1939; after the war, Cela became indecisive towards his university studies and ended up working in a bureau of textile industries. It was here where he began to write what would become his first novel,  (The Family of Pascual Duarte), which was finally published when he was 26, in 1942. Pascual Duarte has trouble finding validity in conventional morality and commits a number of crimes, including murders, for which he feels nothing. The novel is of particular importance as it played a large part in shaping the direction of the post-World War II Spanish novel. 

Cela became a censor in Francoist Spain in 1943. Perhaps his best-known work was produced during a period where his own writing came under scrutiny from his fellow censors, including  (The Hive) which was published in Buenos Aires in 1951, having been banned in Spain. The novel features more than 300 characters and a style showing the influence of both Spanish realism  and contemporary English and French-language authors.

In 1988 he wrote  (Christ versus Arizona), which tells the story of the Gunfight at the O.K. Corral in a single sentence that is more than one hundred pages long.

Legacy
On 26 May 1957, Cela was appointed a member of the Royal Spanish Academy and given Seat Q. He was appointed Royal Senator in the Constituent Cortes, where he exerted some influence in the wording of the Spanish Constitution of 1978. In 1987, he was awarded the Prince of Asturias Award for Literature.

Cela was awarded the Nobel Prize in Literature in 1989 "for a rich and intensive prose, which with restrained compassion forms a challenging vision of man's vulnerability".

In 1994, he was awarded the Premio Planeta, although some question the objectivity of the awards, and winners on occasion have refused to accept it. Two years later, in recognition of his contributions to literature, Cela was ennobled on 17 May 1996 by King Juan Carlos I, who gave Cela the hereditary title of Marquess of Iria Flavia in the nobility of Spain. On his death the title passed to his son Camilo José Cela Conde.

Controversies
The Hive was first published in Argentina, as Franco's Spanish State banned it because of the perceived immorality of its content referencing erotic themes. This meant that his name could no longer appear in the printed media. Nevertheless, Cela remained loyal to Francoist Spain, even working as an informer for the Spanish secret police by reporting on the activities of dissident groups and betraying fellow intellectuals.

In his later years Cela became known for his scandalous outbursts; in an interview with Mercedes Milá for Spanish state television he boasted of his ability to absorb litres of water via his anus while offering to demonstrate. Cela had already scandalized Spanish society with his  (Secret Dictionary, 1969–1971), a dictionary of slang and taboo words.

Cela described the Spanish Cervantes Prize for lifetime achievement as a writer as being "covered with shit". In 1995 he was offered the prize, which he accepted.

In 1998, Cela expressed discomfort towards the presence of homosexual groups at the commemoration of Federico García Lorca's centenary, stating that, "For me, I would prefer a more straightforward and less anecdotal commemoration without the support of gay groups. I have nothing against gays, I just do not take it up the ass".

Death
Cela died from heart disease on 17 January 2002 at the Hospital Centro in Madrid, aged 85. He was buried in his hometown at the parish cemetery of Santa María de Adina.

Cela's will was contested because he favoured his widow and second younger wife, Marina Castaño, over his son Camilo José Cela Conde from his first marriage to Rosario Conde.

Selected works

Spanish

Novels
 
 
 
 
 
  (Also published under the title Historias de Venezuela.)

Short-story collections

Drama and poetry collections

Travel writing

Essays

Criticism

Reference works

  (Updated since initial publication.)
  (4 volumes.)

Memoirs

Correspondence

  (Cela's correspondence with 13 exiled Spanish writers: María Zambrano, Rafael Alberti, Américo Castro, Fernando Arrabal, Jorge Guillén, Max Aub, Emilio Prados, Luis Cernuda, Manuel Altolaguirre, León Felipe, Corpus Barga, Francisco Ayala, Ramón J. Sender.)

Collected works

  (Volumes published as completed since 1962.) Volume 1: Las tres primeras novelas (1942—44); Volume 2: Cuentos (1941—53); Volume 3: Apuntes carpetovetonicos. Novelas cortas (1941–56); Volume 4: Viajes por España, 1 (1948—52); Volume 5: Viajes por España, 2 (1952—58); Volume 6: Viajes por España, 3 (1959—64)l Volume 7: Tres novelas más (1951—55); Volume 8: Los amigos y otra novela (1960—62); Volume 9: Glosa del mundo en torno. Articulos, 1. (1940—53). Mesa revuelta. 5. ed.; Volume 10: Glosa del mundo en torno. Articulos, 2. (1944—59). Cajón de sastre. 4. ed; Paginas de geografía errabunda. 3. ed.; Volume 1:. Glosa del mundo en torno. Artʹiculos, 3 (1945-1954). Las compañías convenientes y otros fingimientos y cegueras. 3a ed. Garito de hospicianos o Guirigay de imposturas y bambollas. 4a ed.; Volume 12: Glosa del mundo en torno. Artículos, 4 (1943—61). La rueda de los ocios. 4a ed. Cuatro figuras del 98. 2a ed.; Volume 14: Enciclopedia del erotismo, 1. Aachen—Cirene; Volume 15: Enciclopedia del erotismo, 1. Cirial—Futrʹosofo; Volume 16: Enciclopedia del erotismo, 3. Gabacho—Óvulo; Volume 17: Enciclopedia del erotismo, 4. Pabst—Zurrucarse.

English translations

 
  (Reprinted: New York: New York: Noonday Press, 1990.) Translation of La colmena.
 
  Translation of Viaje a la Alcarria.
 
  Authorized translation of Mrs. Caldwell habla con su hijo.
  Translation of Visperas, festividad y octava de San Camilo del año 1936 en Madrid.
  Translation of Mazurca para dos muertos.
  Translation of Madera de boj.

See also
 Journey to the Alcarria
 Café Gijón (Madrid)
 Universidad Camilo José Cela

References

External links

 Camilo José Cela Foundation
 
 BBC obituary
 Biography of Camilo José Cela
 
 
 Genealogy of Cela Family

|-

|-

|-

 
1916 births
2002 deaths
People from the Province of A Coruña
Writers from Galicia (Spain)
Nobel laureates in Literature
Premio Cervantes winners
Spanish Nobel laureates
Margraves of Iria Flavia
Spanish male novelists
20th-century travel writers
Spanish travel writers
Spanish people of English descent
Spanish people of the Spanish Civil War (National faction)
Spanish military personnel of the Spanish Civil War (National faction)
Members of the Royal Spanish Academy
Complutense University of Madrid alumni
Spanish people of Italian descent
Recipients of the Order of the Liberator General San Martin
Academic staff of the University of the Balearic Islands
Knights Grand Cross of the Order of Isabella the Catholic
20th-century Spanish novelists
People educated at Instituto San Isidro
Censorship in Spain